Dr Thomas Spens FRSE (1764–1842) was an 18th/19th century Scottish physician who served as President of the Royal College of Physicians of Edinburgh from 1803 to 1806.

He was one of the first (1793) to provide a written report on what is now called cardiovascular syncope or Stokes-Adams syndrome.

Life

He was born in 1764 the son of Nathaniel Spens of Lathallan in north-east Fife. The   Spens family  owned the estate of Lathallan in Fife and his grandfather was Thomas Spens, 15th Laird  of Lathallan

Spens studied medicine at the University of Edinburgh  qualifying MD  in 1784. At this time he lived  with his parents on Niddry's Wynd off the Royal Mile in Edinburgh (now known as Niddry Street).

In 1788 he was elected a Fellow of the Royal Society of Edinburgh. His proposers were Dr James Gregory, Sir James Hall, and Andrew Duncan, the elder. He was a physician at Edinburgh Royal Infirmary and Edinburgh Lunatic Asylum. In 1789 he was elected a member of the Aesculapian Club.

In 1789 he was elected a Fellow of the Royal College of Physicians of Edinburgh. By 1794 his father was living at 13 Horse Wynd at the foot of the Canongate near Holyrood Palace and Thomas is presumed to still live with him.

In 1803 he succeeded Dr William Wright as President of the Royal College of Physicians of Edinburgh, having previously served as the college Treasurer. Like his father he was a member of the Royal Company of Archers (the monarch's bodyguard in Scotland). He presented his father's yew bow to the Company where it remains on display. He was succeeded in his role as President by Charles Stuart of Dunearn.

By 1810 his father had retired and Thomas was running his practice on Horse Wynd.

He disappears from Edinburgh records in the 1820s and reappears around 1830 at Drummond Place in Edinburgh's Second New Town.

He died at home 14 Drummond Place on 27 May 1842.

Family
He had one son, James Spens (1797-1870), by an early relationship. As James did not inherit from his father he was presumably illegitimate.

His wife Bethia Wood (1781-1867) outlived him and lived at Drummond Place with their son Nathaniel Spens WS (b.1801) and a daughter Helen (b.1821).

Description of Stokes-Adams syndrome 
The condition now known as cardiovascular syncope was probably first described in 1761 by the Italian Giovanni Battista Morgagni (1682-1771). Spens published in 1793 a case history which has been described as the first published account  by a British author of episodes of cardiovascular syncope almost certainly resulting from third degree heart block. The eponymous name relates to the Dublin physicians Robert Adams, who described a case in 1827, and  William Stokes, also of Dublin, who published four cases in 1846.

Spens' description preceded both of these. In an article entitled "History of a case in which there took place a remarkable slowness of the pulse",  Spens described the case of a previously well man who 'fell to the ground senseless' and 'continued in that state for 5 minutes.' The man's pulse rate was noted to be 24 beats per minute but regular and of normal strength. Several subsequent episodes occurred over the  next few days, in some instances accompanied by convulsions and always with a slow regular pulse of normal strength, recorded on one occasion at 10 beats per minute. The patient died after one such episode and no abnormality was found at autopsy. The case report was published in Medical Commentaries for the year 1792, edited by Andrew Duncan.

References

1764 births
1842 deaths
People from Fife
Alumni of the University of Edinburgh
Presidents of the Royal College of Physicians of Edinburgh
Fellows of the Royal Society of Edinburgh